Michelle Roark (born November 16, 1974) is an American freestyle skier who has competed since 1995, mainly in moguls. She is a two-time Olympian, World Cup Champion, World Champion silver medalist FIS Freestyle World Ski Championships 2003 in Deer Valley, Utah and National Champion.  She has a half a dozen World Cup victories and a handful of World Cup podium finishes. Roark was named to the US team for the 2006 Winter Olympics and 2010 Winter Olympics.

Personal life 
Roark is a cum laude graduate of Colorado School of Mines in chemical engineering, scientist of bioenergetics, certified perfumer, author and wellness entrepreneur. She is the Founder and CEO of Phia Lab, where she studies the bioenergetics of the botanical world. The Lab is based in Denver, Colorado, where she also runs and operates the award-winning Phia Alchemy Wellness Salon Spa. Today, she is pioneering a new field that bridges performance, material science and the world of energy vibration. Through Phia, she spreads the point of view that the bioenergetics of nature can help you achieve mind, body and energy coherence—the zone.

References 

 
 Lenke, Tim. "Hard economic times hinder Winter Olympic hopefuls". Washington Times Weekly Edition. December 21, 2009. p. 29.
 Phia Lab website
 
 
 

1974 births
Living people
21st-century American engineers
American female freestyle skiers
Colorado School of Mines alumni
Freestyle skiers at the 2006 Winter Olympics
Freestyle skiers at the 2010 Winter Olympics
Olympic freestyle skiers of the United States
Skiers from Denver
People from Artesia, New Mexico
21st-century American women